Post-consumerism is a view or ideology that well-being, as distinct from material prominence, is the aim of life, and often suggesting that there is a growing willingness to assert such. Post-consumerism can also be viewed as moving beyond the current model of addictive consumerism. This personal and societal strategy utilizes each individual's core values to identify the "satisfaction of enough for today," also called "self-defined enoughness." The intent and outcome of this basic strategy to date has "reached people where they are rather than simply where we are." Therefore the campaign "is promoting this intriguing question" regardless of the answer: Do I have enough stuff for now?

See also 
 Degrowth
 Gross National Happiness
 Happiness economics
 Happy Planet Index
 Humanistic economics
 Post growth

References

External links
 Postconsumers.com
Consumerism
Economic ideologies
Social philosophy